David Richmond Gardner (31 March 1873 – 5 November 1931) was a Scottish footballer, who played as a left-back.

Born in Glasgow, Gardner started his footballing career with Third Lanark before moving south to play for Newcastle United and Grimsby Town. In 1904 he joined West Ham United. Gardner made his West Ham debut on 1 September 1904 in a 3–0 home win against Millwall. He played 80 games without scoring before joining Croydon Common in 1907.
He died in 1931.

International career
Gardner played a single game for Scotland, in a 2–2 draw against Wales on 20 March 1897.

References

Scottish footballers
Association football fullbacks
Grimsby Town F.C. players
West Ham United F.C. players
1873 births
1931 deaths
Southern Football League players
Scottish Football League players
English Football League players
Scotland international footballers
Croydon Common F.C. players
Third Lanark A.C. players
Newcastle United F.C. players
Footballers from Glasgow